Gatehouse Prison was a prison in Westminster, built in 1370 as the gatehouse of Westminster Abbey. It was first used as a prison by the Abbot, a powerful churchman who held considerable power over the precincts and sanctuary. It was one of the prisons which supplied the Old Bailey with information on former prisoners (such as their identity or prior criminal records) for making indictments against criminals

While he was imprisoned in the Gatehouse for petitioning to have the Clergy Act 1640 annulled, Richard Lovelace wrote "To Althea, from Prison", with its famous line
"Stone walls do not a prison make, Nor iron bars a cage"

The Gatehouse prison was demolished in 1776. On its site, in front of the Abbey's Great West Door, is the Westminster scholars' Crimean War Memorial.

Notable inmates
Giles Wigginton, Puritan cleric and controversialist, was imprisoned for 2 months around 1584, for refusing to take an oath.
Sir Walter Raleigh was held here the night before he was beheaded in Old Palace Yard, Westminster on 29 October 1618. 
The Gatehouse prison held many famous dissenters and people charged with treasonous crimes, including Thomas Bates, Christopher Holywood, Richard Lovelace, Samuel Pepys, John Southworth, Sir Thomas Ragland, Henry Savile and Laurence Vaux.

References

Further reading

1370 establishments in England
1770s disestablishments in Great Britain
1776 disestablishments
Defunct prisons in London
Demolished prisons
Former buildings and structures in the City of Westminster
Gatehouses (architecture)
Demolished buildings and structures in London
Buildings and structures demolished in 1776